Schlotheim is a former Verwaltungsgemeinschaft in the district of Unstrut-Hainich-Kreis in Thuringia, Germany. The seat of the Verwaltungsgemeinschaft was in Schlotheim. It was disbanded in December 2019.

The Verwaltungsgemeinschaft Schlotheim consisted of the following municipalities:

 Bothenheilingen 
 Issersheilingen 
 Kleinwelsbach 
 Körner 
 Marolterode 
 Neunheilingen 
 Obermehler 
 Schlotheim

Former Verwaltungsgemeinschaften in Thuringia